County routes in Wyoming County, New York, serve as connections between major routes in the county. Wyoming County does not use the Manual on Uniform Traffic Control Devices-standard yellow-on-blue pentagonal route marker to sign its county routes; however, most county route numbers are listed on street blade signs.

Routes 1–30

Routes 31 and up

See also

County routes in New York
List of former state routes in New York (301–400)

Notes

References